The 1996 Finnish Figure Skating Championships took place between January 5 and 7, 1996. Skaters competed at the senior and junior levels in the disciplines of men's singles and women's singles, and senior ice dancing.

Senior results

Men

Ladies

Ice dancing

Junior results

Men

Ladies

External links
 Results

Finnish Figure Skating Championships, 1996
Finnish Figure Skating Championships
1996 in Finnish sport